George Selwyn  may refer to:
George Augustus Selwyn (politician) (1719–1791), English politician and wit
George Selwyn (bishop of Lichfield) (1809–1878), first Bishop of New Zealand
George Selwyn (bishop of Tinnevelly) (1887–1957), Anglican colonial bishop